Georgeta is a Romanian feminine given name. Notable people with the name include:

Georgeta Damian, Romanian rower
Georgeta Gabor, Romanian artistic gymnast
Georgeta Hurmuzachi, Romanian artistic gymnast
Georgeta Lăcusta
Georgeta Stoleriu

Romanian feminine given names